Full River Red is a 2023 historical suspense comedy film directed by Zhang Yimou, and stars Shen Teng and Jackson Yee, alongside Zhang Yi, Lei Jiayin, Wang Jiayi and Yue Yunpeng. It was released in theaters in China on January 22, 2023, the same day as the Chinese New Year Day.

Plot
The film chronicles a mystery case set in the beginning era of Southern Song dynasty. It is set four years after Yue Fei's death (around 1146). A mysterious murder occurs at Qin Hui's residence when he meets delegates from the rival Jin Dynasty. A soldier and a commander become entangled in a large conspiracy as one of the Jin envoys perishes and a confidential letter is reported missing. Righteous vigilantes are responsible for the incident and want to kill a suspected traitor.

Cast
The following cast is featured:
 Shen Teng as Zhang Da (张大), a recruited soldier without rank
 Jackson Yee as Sun Jun (孙均), the deputy commander of the guard battalion
 Zhang Yi as He Li (何立), the general manager of the grand chancellor bureau
 Lei Jiayin as Qin Hui, the grand chancellor
 Wang Jiayi (王佳怡) as Zither (Yao Qin 瑶琴), a dancing girl and Zhang Da's love
 Yue Yunpeng as Wu Yichun (武义淳), the vice general manager of the grand chancellor bureau
 Pan Binlong (潘斌龙) as Ding Sanwang (丁三旺), a Song soldier who dies
 Yu Ailei (余皑磊) as Liu Xi (刘喜), a Song dynasty peasant who is stabbed to death by He Li's mandate
 Guo Jingfei (郭京飞) as Wang Biao (王彪)
 Ou Hao as Zheng Wan (郑万), a Song soldier
 Wei Xiang (魏翔) as Hadeng (哈登), a Jin envoy who is killed
 Zhang Chi (张弛) as Chen Liang (陈亮), a Song soldier (left guard)
 Huang Yan (黄炎) as Hu Yong (胡永), a Song soldier (right guard) who is sentenced to death (beheading) as tribute to the Jin dynasty
 Xu Jingya (许静雅) as Lan Yu (蓝玉)
 Jiang Pengyu (蒋鹏宇) as Lüzhu (绿珠), a dancing girl
 Lin Boyang (林博洋) as Liu Yan (柳燕), a dancing girl who dies
 Fei Fan (飞凡) as Qingmei (青梅), a dancing girl
 Ren Sinuo (任思诺) as Yao Yatou (姚丫头), Liu Xi's daughter
 Chen Yongsheng (陈永胜) as a Song soldier
 Zhang Yinan (张壹男) as Chen Xi (陈锡), Song dynasty secretary
Some characters (such as He Li) are based on the novel General Yue Fei, written by Qian Cai during the Qing dynasty. Some characters also share names with historical people from other time periods such as Lan Yu, a general who was executed by Zhu Yuanzhang during the early Ming dynasty, and Lüzhu, an ancient Chinese singer.

Production

Development 

The title is from one of the most famous poems Man Jiang Hong attributed to Yue Fei. Yue Fei was a military general of the Southern Song Dynasty (1127-1279). He is a symbol of patriotism and loyalty to his country. However, Yue Fei was framed and executed by the Song emperor Zhao Gou along with Prime Minister Qin Hui. Although the poem is attributed to Yue Fei, there are theories that Yue Fei did not actually write it. Some even say that the poem was written in a different time period (e.g. after the Song dynasty), citing the fact that Helan mountains and Xiongnu are mentioned.

The poem Man Jiang Hong is recited during film by Qin Hui's double in front of the Song army.

Filming 
The film officially announced that the filming began on June 26, 2022. The filming took place in Taiyuan, Shanxi. It finished filming in August 2022.

Release
The film released the first trailer on December 27, 2022. On the same day, it also announced that the film was scheduled for release on January 22, 2023. On December 29, 2022, the film released the list of full cast. On January 5, 2023, it released the character names of full cast.

As of March 18, 2023, the film is China's sixth highest-grossing box office entry of all time and the highest grosser of 2023 Chinese New Year.

Movie Box Office 
Full River Red has a box office of 4.54 billion yuan from its release on January 22, 2023 to March 2023.

References

External links
 

Chinese mystery films
Films directed by Zhang Yimou
Films set in 12th-century Song dynasty
Films shot in Shanxi
2023 in Chinese cinema